Villanos may refer to:

 Villanos (band), an Argentinian band
 Villainous (TV series) (Spanish: Villanos), a Mexican animated series
 Los Villanos, a family of wrestlers (see :Template:Villanos)

See also
 Villainous (disambiguation)